Mela Amaravathi  (also known as Amaravathi) is a panchayat in the Valangaiman taluk of Thiruvarur district in the Indian state of Tamil Nadu.

Alangudi (Gurusthalam) is 2 kilometers away, Valangaiman (mariyamman koil) is 5 km away.

Politics
Valangiman belongs to Nannilam assembly constituency (SC), and is part of Nagapattinam (Lok Sabha constituency).

References

Villages in Tiruvarur district